Flexor pollicis muscle may refer to:

 Flexor pollicis brevis muscle
 Flexor pollicis longus muscle